The White Hell of Pitz Palu is a 1950 West German mountain film directed by Rolf Hansen and starring Hans Albers, Liselotte Pulver and Adrian Hoven. It is a remake of Arnold Fanck's 1929 film The White Hell of Pitz Palu. Interiors were shot at the Bavaria Studios in Munich. It was a prominent early role for the developing Swiss star Pulver.

Plot
A young American couple accompany a veteran mountaineer on a dangerous climb in the Swiss Alps.

Cast

References

Bibliography

External links 
 

1950 films
1950s adventure drama films
German adventure drama films
West German films
1950s German-language films
German black-and-white films
Mountaineering films
Films directed by Rolf Hansen
Films set in Switzerland
Films set in the Alps
Films based on short fiction
Remakes of German films
1950 drama films
1950s German films
Films shot at Bavaria Studios